West Thurrock Athletic Football Club was a football club based in West Thurrock, England.

History
Founded in 1946, West Thurrock Athletic joined the South Essex League, joining the London League Division Two a year later. West Thurrock entered the 1947–48 FA Cup, reaching the first qualifying round, before losing 3–0 away to neighbours Grays Athletic. In 1950, the club won promotion to the Premier Division, winning it in 1952. In the 1962–63 season, West Thurrock finished runners-up in the London League. In 1964, the club became founder members of the Greater London League, playing in the system before folding at the end of the 1967–68 season.

Ground
Initially, the club played at the West Thurrock Memorial Ground, before moving to Bay House Meadow on London Road in West Thurrock.

Records
Best FA Cup performance: First qualifying round, 1947–48

References

External links

London League (football)
Greater London League
Defunct football clubs in Essex
1946 establishments in England
Sport in Thurrock
Association football clubs established in 1946
1968 disestablishments in England
Association football clubs disestablished in 1968
South Essex League